Ubon Kruanapat Football Club (Thai สโมสรฟุตบอลอุบล ครัวนภัส), is a Thai professional football club based in Ubon Ratchathani Province. The club was formed in 2009 and entered the Thai League 3 Northeastern region.

History

Crest history

Name changes

 2010: Ubon Tiger F.C.
 2012: Ubon Ratchathani F.C.
 2013: Ubon UMT F.C.
 2015: Ubon Ratchathani F.C.
 2020: Ubon Kruanapat F.C.

Stadium

Stadium and locations

Season by season record

P = Played
W = Games won
D = Games drawn
L = Games lost
F = Goals for
A = Goals against
Pts = Points
Pos = Final position

QR1 = First Qualifying Round
QR2 = Second Qualifying Round
R1 = Round 1
R2 = Round 2
R3 = Round 3
R4 = Round 4

R5 = Round 5
R6 = Round 6
QF = Quarter-finals
SF = Semi-finals
RU = Runners-up
W = Winners

Players

Current squad

Club staff

Honours
Regional League North-East Division
 Winners : 2014
 Runners-up : 2016

References

External links
 https://www.facebook.com/UBFC2015/
 http://www.facebook.com/ubonfcfanclub

Association football clubs established in 2010
Football clubs in Thailand
Ubon Ratchathani province
2010 establishments in Thailand